Bolekhiv is a regional city in Kalush Raion, Ivano-Frankivsk Oblast (province) of Ukraine. It was once home to a large Jewish community, very few of whom survived World War II. Bolekhiv hosts the administration of Bolekhiv urban hromada, one of the hromadas of Ukraine. Population: .

History 
Bolekhiv is first mentioned in historical records in 1371 after the defeat of the Kingdom of Galicia–Volhynia to Poland. During the Galicia–Volhynia Wars in the 14th century, Bolekhiv was variously held by Poland, Hungary (Danylo Dazhbohovych), and Lithuania. Subsequently, King Jogaila of Poland succeeded and Bolekhiv became part of the Kingdom of Poland.

In 1546, Emilia Hrosovska established a salt refinery in the town. In 1603, Sigismund III Vasa gave the town the Magdeburg rights. At that time, the Bolekhiv region was involved with the Opryshky movement led by Oleksa Dovbush and German colonists arrived.

Following the First Partition of Poland in 1772, the town became part of the Habsburg monarchy's Kingdom of Galicia and Lodomeria. Following the Peace of Schönbrunn in 1809, the area was ceded to the Russian Empire but was returned to the Habsburg monarchy as a result of the Congress of Vienna in 1815.

After the dissolution of Austria-Hungary in 1918, the town became part of the Second Polish Republic. After the Soviet invasion of Poland in 1939, it was incorporated into the Ukrainian SSR. Following the invasion of the Soviet Union by Nazi Germany in summer 1941, the area was administrated as part of the General Government. When the Soviet Union retook the area in 1944, the region returned to the Ukrainian SSR. After World War II, Bolekhiv became a raion (a region of local governance). In 1964, its raion was merged with Dolyna Raion. Since the dissolution of the Ukrainian SSR and the Soviet Union in 1991, the area has been part of independent Ukraine. Since 1993 the city has been governed by the Ivano-Frankivsk Oblast.

Until 18 July 2020, Bolekhiv was incorporated as a city of oblast significance and the center of Bolekhiv Municipality. The municipality was abolished in July 2020 as part of the administrative reform of Ukraine, which reduced the number of raions of Ivano-Frankivsk Oblast to six. The area of Bolekhiv Municipality was merged into Kalush Raion.

Bolekhiv Jews 

A Jewish community existed in Bolekhiv (Yiddish pronunciation: Bolechov) since its establishment by Nicholas Gydzincki. The town founder proclaimed equal rights to the three ethnic groups living there, Jews, Polish Catholics and Ruthenians (Ukrainians of the Greek Orthodox), and this was confirmed by Sigismund III Vasa, the king of the new Polish–Lithuanian Commonwealth, formerly crown prince of Poland, the grand duke of Lithuania, and later to become king of Sweden.

The town was a privately owned town, and the changes of ownership or inheritance had a strong impact on all the residents of the town, especially the Jews. In 1670, after the Tatars invaded and burnt the town down, the town owner gave the Jews a large loan to rebuild. Towards the middle of the 19th century there was much tension between the Jews and the other ethnicities.

A Hassidic rebbe, Rabbi Shneibalg, "the Rebbe of Bolechov", had a large Hassidic court in the town. By 1890, seventy-five percent of the population of Bolekhiv (4,237 people) was Jewish.

Atrocities began in 1935, with a hostile government and population, and escalated after the German conquest in 1941. By 1940 the Jewish population of Bolekhiv reached about 3,000. In October 1941, four months after capturing the town, the German police carried out a first Aktion (German annihilation operation) in Bolekhiv, which included a list of 1,000 of the Jewish rabbis, leaders, doctors and wealthy people, who were tortured for two days, and then shot in a nearby forest, some buried alive.

In the population of Jews increased by the thousands in 1941 and 1942 from the surrounding towns. About a year later, 3 to 5 September 1942, the Germans planned a second attack. The Jews were warned in advance by a member of their Judenrat who was in a nearby town, but many of the local Ukrainians began a murder spree in the preceding afternoon, targeting mainly children, in horrific acts of barbarity. The Germans joined in the action, and continued to grab people from their houses or hiding places.
About 1,500 Jews were murdered, 600-700 of them children, and an additional 2,000 Jews were sent to the Belzec death camp where most were subsequently murdered.

Other Aktions continued into 1943 when the surviving 900 Jews, working in makeshift "work groups", were marched to the cemetery nearby, in groups of 100 or 200, and shot.

Only 48 Jews of the town survived World War II

Geography 

The Bolekhiv municipality was located in the western part of Ukraine in Ivano-Frankivsk Oblast. It shared borders with Dolyna Raion (east), Lviv Oblast (north, southwest and west), Zhydachiv Raion, Stryi Raion, and Skole Raion. Two rivers, the Sukil and the Svicha, run through the town before joining the Dniester. The Carpathian Mountains lie to the southwest. Bolekhiv is on Ukraine highway 10 between Dolyna and Stryi. The capital, Kyiv is approximately 300 km away in a west northwesterly direction.

Administrative divisions 
On 21 October 1993, Bolekhiv received the status of a regional city (up until then, it had been a city in Dolyna Raion). It encompasses six rural municipalities (communes) and eleven villages.
The communes are:
 Huziiv
 Kozakivka, Sukil
 Mizhrichchia, Zarichchia
 Pidberezhzhia
 Polianytsia, Bubnyshche, Bukovets
 Tysiv, Taniava

Population 
In 2001, Bolekhiv city's population was 21,232. The largest districts in Bolekhiv are Bolekhiv city (10,590), Tysiv commune (3,352) and Mizhrichchia commune (1,891). The smallest community is the Huziiv commune with a population of 1,159 (2001).

Notable citizens 
 Kazimiera Alberti, Polish writer and translator.
 Dov Ber Birkenthal (1723–1805) also known as Ber of Bolechow, a Jewish merchant and scholar. His memoirs, which he wrote in Hebrew, are housed at the National Library of Canada, Ottawa. The memoirs were translated into Yiddish (Klal-farlag, Berlin, 1922) and into English (Arno Press, New York, 1973) by Mark Vishnitzer. They describe the town and the Jews of Galicia over a period of over fifty years.
 The author Leah Horowitz lived in Bolechów.
 Juliusz Holzmuller, a Polish painter.
 Nataliya Kobrynska (1855–1920), a Ukrainian writer and public activist. She organised the feminist movement in the region and was a friend of Olha Kobylianska.
 Marceli Najder, a Polish politician, deputy to the Sejm.
 Ivan Franko, visited the city from 1884–1888 and later wrote a drama, The Stolen Happiness (Ukradene shchastia).
 Bernard Semel (1878–1959), American merchant and philanthropist
 Aron Adolf Aberbach (1878–1959), the father of Julian Aberbach (1909–2004) and Jean Aberbach (1910–1992), founders of the Hill and Range music publishing house, which was instrumental in the careers of Elvis Presley, Johnny Cash, Ray Charles, Edith Piaf and Jacques Brel.

Places of interest 
 Synagogue
 Jewish cemetery Fully documented at Jewish Galicia and Bukovina ORG
 Castles and temples of Ukraine. Castles Ukraine website 
 Roman Skvorij museum of Bolekhiv

Surroundings
Local orientation

Regional orientation

References

Further reading 
 
 
 "Neighbors and murderers." Documentary

External links 

 Bolekhiv at Jewish Galicia
 Bolekhov at KehilaLinks
 
 Old map showing Bolekhiv. Lolikantor website
Bolechow Jewish cemetery fully documented at Jewish Galicia and Buckovina ORG

Cities in Ivano-Frankivsk Oblast
Shtetls
Cities of regional significance in Ukraine
Holocaust locations in Ukraine